In mathematics, a Tate module of an abelian group, named for John Tate, is a module constructed from an abelian group A. Often, this construction is made in the following situation: G is a commutative group scheme over a field K, Ks is the separable closure of K, and A = G(Ks) (the Ks-valued points of G). In this case, the Tate module of A is equipped with an action of the absolute Galois group of K, and it is referred to as the Tate module of G.

Definition
Given an abelian group A and a prime number p, the p-adic Tate module of A is

where A[pn] is the pn torsion of A (i.e. the kernel of the multiplication-by-pn map), and the inverse limit is over positive integers n with transition morphisms given by the multiplication-by-p map A[pn+1] → A[pn]. Thus, the Tate module encodes all the p-power torsion of A. It is equipped with the structure of a Zp-module via

Examples

The Tate module
When the abelian group A is the group of roots of unity in a separable closure Ks of K, the p-adic Tate module of A is sometimes referred to as the Tate module (where the choice of p and K are tacitly understood). It is a free rank one module over Zp with a linear action of the absolute Galois group GK of K. Thus, it is a Galois representation also referred to as the p-adic cyclotomic character of K. It can also be considered as the Tate module of the multiplicative group scheme Gm,K over K.

The Tate module of an abelian variety
Given an abelian variety G over a field K, the Ks-valued points of G are an abelian group. The p-adic Tate module Tp(G) of G is a Galois representation (of the absolute Galois group, GK, of K).

Classical results on abelian varieties show that if K has characteristic zero, or characteristic ℓ where the prime number p ≠ ℓ, then Tp(G) is a free module over Zp of rank 2d, where d is the dimension of G. In the other case, it is still free, but the rank may take any value from 0 to d (see for example Hasse–Witt matrix).

In the case where p is not equal to the characteristic of K, the p-adic Tate module of G is the dual of the étale cohomology .

A special case of the Tate conjecture can be phrased in terms of Tate modules. Suppose K is finitely generated over its prime field (e.g. a finite field, an algebraic number field, a global function field), of characteristic different from p, and A and B are two abelian varieties over K. The Tate conjecture then predicts that

where HomK(A, B) is the group of morphisms of abelian varieties from A to B, and the right-hand side is the group of GK-linear maps from Tp(A) to Tp(B). The case where K is a finite field was proved by Tate himself in the 1960s. Gerd Faltings proved the case where K is a number field in his celebrated "Mordell paper".

In the case of a Jacobian over a curve C over a finite field k of characteristic prime to p, the Tate module can be identified with the Galois group of the composite extension

Tate module of a number field
The description of the Tate module for the function field of a curve over a finite field suggests a definition for a Tate module of an  algebraic number field, the other class of global field, introduced by Kenkichi Iwasawa. Let

Then Tp(K) is a pro-p-group and so a Zp-module.  Using class field theory one can describe Tp(K) as isomorphic to the inverse limit of the class groups Cm of the Km under norm.

Iwasawa exhibited Tp(K) as a module over the completion Zp[[T]] and this implies a formula for the exponent of p in the order of the class groups Cm of the form

The Ferrero–Washington theorem states that μ is zero.

See also
Tate conjecture
Tate twist
Iwasawa theory

Notes

References

Section 13 of 

Abelian varieties